Roderick Matheson may refer to:

 Roderick Matheson (1793–1873), Ontario businessman and Conservative member of the Senate of Canada
 Roderick N. Matheson (1824–1862), officer in the Union Army in the American Civil War
 Roderick Matheson (judge), judge in the Supreme Court of South Australia from 1979 to 1998